Orsha District is a second-level administrative subdivision (district) of Belarus in the Vitebsk Region. The administrative center of the district is Orsha.

Notable residents 
 Alexander Lukashenko (1954, Kopys) - President of Belarus (1994–present)

References

 
Districts of Vitebsk Region